Teys Australia is a meat-processing company headquartered at Building 3, Freeway Office Park, 2728 Logan Rd, Eight Mile Plains QLD 4113, Australia. In 2014, it was Australia's second-largest meat processor and exporter, with export operations in 40 countries.

History 
In 1946, the four Teys brothers, Cid, Cliff, Mick, and Max, purchased a series of butcher shops in and around Brisbane. By 1952, the business grew to eight shops, a wholesale operation, and a newly completed abattoir at Beenleigh, where the company continues to have its headquarters.

Teys has a history of working in various partnerships over the decades, including with Canada Packers Inc, Consolidated Press Holdings, and since 2011, Cargill. Through a partnership with Teys, reversing the significant losses of the Lakes Creek Abattoir then controlled by Kerry Packer became possible.

Teys has built long-lasting international supply relationships, particularly in Japan, to which it was one of the first exporters of chilled beef.

Current operations 
Teys Australia Pty Ltd is a 50/50 partnership between the Teys family and the Cargill Company. It is Australia's second-largest meat processor and exporter, with export operations in 40 countries. Teys operates six modern and efficient beef-processing plants, as well as owning two feedlots, cattle hide-processing operations, and other beef-related businesses.

Teys process 32,000 cattle weekly, which generate a turnover of around AU$2.5 billion annually. Teys continues to develop its international business in response to growing Asian demand. Teys USA is a subsidiary company based in Chicago.

In a highly competitive global beef market, Teys is dedicated to customer service, integrity of product, and efficiency of production and marketing, coupled with control of all facets of the value chain. Teys' success can also be attributed to the dedication of successive generations of the family and their values of hard work, humility, and respect for their employees and stakeholders.

Teys operate across a number of sites in Australia:
Meat-processing facilities in Rockhampton (Lakes Creek), Biloela, and Beenleigh in Queensland, Tamworth and Wagga Wagga in New South Wales, and Naracoorte in South Australia
Feedlots in Condamine in Queensland, Jindalee in New South Wales, and  Charlton in Victoria
Hide processing in Murgon in Queensland
Manufacturing delicatessen food and convenience meals at Hemmant in Queensland
Manufacturing consumer-ready fresh meat in Wagga Wagga

Awards 
The company has a record of hiring and up-skilling migrant and refugee workers. In 2013, the company received an Enterprise Award from the Queensland government as part of its annual Multicultural Awards.

In 2014, the company was inducted into the Queensland Business Leaders Hall of Fame.

References

Attribution

External links 
 
 Teys Australia digital stories and oral history: Queensland Business Leaders Hall of Fame 2014, State Library of Queensland

Meat processing in Australia
Companies based in Queensland
Food and drink companies of Australia
Meat companies
Meat packers
Privately held companies of Australia